Andrew Holt (born 21 April 1978, Stockport, Greater Manchester) is an English former professional footballer who last played as a defender for Corby Town.

Career

Oldham Athletic
Holt started his career at Oldham Athletic where he stayed for six years, playing 114 times and scoring 10 goals. Holt sufficiently impressed Hull City during a loan spell, who paid £150,000 to secure his services. He came up through the club's centre of excellence.

Hull City and Wrexham
His career at Hull City was quite good to start; he played 30 times in his first season. However, the following year, he found himself surplus to requirements, first loaned out to Barnsley and then Shrewsbury Town. In the 2003–04 season, only starting six of his 25 games that season. He found himself moving to Wrexham on a free transfer. At Wrexham, he played 86 matches, scoring on 10 occasions. He took part in the club's Football League Trophy win in 2005. At the end of his two-year contract, he got offered a deal by League One side Northampton Town, allowing him to prove himself in the next league up.

Northampton
In his first season at Northampton, having been snapped up on a Bosman transfer by manager John Gorman, able to play in many positions he was used as a utility man, he played 37 games, none of them from the bench as had been his career's main problem, and scored twice. He was retained by the club at the end of the 2006–07 season. However at the end of the 2009/2010 season, Holt turned down a new 2-year deal with Northampton. But on 9 June, Holt signed a new 2-year deal with Northampton, a month after turning down the previous offer.

Corby Town
In July 2012, following his release from Northampton, Holt rejoined former Northampton Town manager Ian Sampson at local Conference North side, Corby Town. However, in August 2012 Holt was forced to retire from football having suffered a knee injury.

Post-playing career
After retirement he moved back to Manchester.

References

External links
Andy Holt player profile at ntfc.co.uk

1978 births
Footballers from Stockport
Living people
English footballers
Association football defenders
Association football utility players
Oldham Athletic A.F.C. players
Hull City A.F.C. players
Barnsley F.C. players
Shrewsbury Town F.C. players
Wrexham A.F.C. players
Northampton Town F.C. players
English Football League players
Corby Town F.C. players